The Canadian Union of Public Employees (CUPE;) is a Canadian trade union serving the public sector – although it has in recent years organized workplaces in the non-profit and para-public sector as well. CUPE is the largest union in Canada, representing some 700,000 workers in health care, education, municipalities, libraries, universities, social services, public utilities, transportation, emergency services and airlines. Over 60 per cent of CUPE's members are women, and almost a third are part-time workers. CUPE is affiliated with the Canadian Labour Congress and is its greatest financial contributor.

History
CUPE was formed in 1963 in a fashion resembling industrial unionism by merging the National Union of Public Employees (NUPE) and the National Union of Public Service Employees (NUPSE).  The first national president was Stan Little, who had previously been the president of NUPSE.    Having led public sector unionism through a period where almost no workers had the right to strike, Little has been credited with bringing public sector unions "from collective begging to collective bargaining." By the time of Little's retirement, CUPE had already grown to 210,000 members and had eclipsed United Steelworkers as the largest affiliate to the Canadian Labour Congress.

Little was followed in 1975 by Grace Hartman, a feminist activist who was the first woman to lead a major labour union in North America. Hartman led CUPE to involve itself in broader struggles for social justice and equality, and emphasized the role of social unionism, as opposed to the more conservative business unionism practised by many North American unions.  She was arrested for leading Ontario hospital workers in defying a back-to-work order from the Ontario Supreme Court in 1981 and sentenced to 45 days in jail. She retired in 1983.

Hartman's successor as president was Jeff Rose, a Toronto city worker. Rose's time as the defining face of CUPE was marked by membership growth from 294,000 to 407,000 members (largely through organizing), a strengthening of CUPE's infrastructure and rank-and-file skills, and his outspoken opposition to Brian Mulroney-era wage restraint, free trade, the GST, privatization, deregulation, and cuts to public services. Under Rose's leadership, CUPE was particularly effective in improving pay and working conditions for women. He stepped down in 1991 after eight years, becoming deputy minister of intergovernmental affairs for the Ontario NDP government.

In 1991, Judy Darcy followed Rose and became the defining face of CUPE. One of Canada's most visible and colourful labour leaders, Darcy was a vigorous opponent of privatization, two-tier health care, and free trade agreements.  Darcy was firmly committed to the union's involvement in broader social issues, and under her tenure CUPE  strongly attacked the invasion of Iraq, condemned Canada's involvement in ballistic missile defence, and spoke out loudly in favour of same-sex marriage. Darcy stepped down in 2003 after 12 years as president, and was replaced by Paul Moist.

On November 4, 2022, more than 55,000 CUPE education workers began an indefinite strike against the Ontario government. Ontario Premier Doug Ford attempted to stop the strike by using the notwithstanding clause, which was criticized by Canadian Prime Minister Justin Trudeau as "wrong and inappropriate."

Internal organization
CUPE has an extremely decentralized structure, in which each local elects its own executive, sets its own dues structure, conducts its own bargaining and strike votes, and sends delegates to division and national conventions to form overarching policy.  Advocates of this system claim that it places the power in the grassroots where it belongs; critics believe that it makes it difficult for it to organize concerted action and leaves the union highly balkanized with policies and strategies varying widely from local to local and sector to sector.  This decentralized structure is often described as "CUPE's greatest strength and its greatest weakness."  This political decentralization is mirrored by an organizational decentralization.  Although CUPE has a national headquarters in Ottawa, it is relatively small—the vast majority of its staff are scattered across over 70 offices across the country.

CUPE locals are affiliated directly to the National body, and affiliation in Provincial CUPE bodies is optional. CUPE National provides locals with support and assistance through National Representatives, who are employees of CUPE National. National Representatives are assigned to specific locals to assist the democratically elected officers of CUPE locals in various aspects of the operation and functioning of the local union. They primarily assist in more complex issues, such as conducting Grievance Arbitrations, bargaining, disability/accommodation issues, human rights, preparation of legal documents, local elections and education. National Representatives also have authority to place a CUPE local under administration, pursuant to the CUPE Constitution, which effectively means that the Representative runs the local for a brief period of time in an extraordinary circumstance and suspends the locally elected officers, usually only in very serious cases of fraud or gross incompetence or misconduct. In addition to servicing National Representatives, CUPE National employs Research Representatives and Legal & Legislative Representatives, who provide research and legal support to locals through their servicing representatives.

Nationally there are two full-time political positions: the National President (currently Mark Hancock) and the National Secretary-Treasurer (currently Candace Rennick).

Provincial divisions

CUPE divisions are the political voice of members in their respective provinces, and an integral part of CUPE. Chartered through the national union, each division advocates and campaigns at the provincial level for legislative, policy and political change in the interests of CUPE members and the communities they serve. Each provincial division is led by a democratically elected president, secretary-treasurer and executive board, who are directed by members at annual conventions (biennial in Quebec). Provincial organizations do not provide any servicing or support to the locals on specific operational items, focusing primarily on provincial lobbying, policy development and union education.

Internal labour relations

CUPE's employees have organized into two main bargaining units. The Canadian Staff Union (CSU) is the larger of the groups. It represents National Representatives and specialist staff in Area and Region Offices across the 10 Regions of CUPE. In 2008 CSU absorbed the Administrative and Technical Staff Union which represented about 60 administrative and technical staff at the Ottawa National Office. The Canadian Office and Professional Employees union (COPE) Local 491 represents support staff workers in the National, regional and area offices of CUPE. Additionally, a handful of CUPE Locals have dedicated CUPE staff working in their own offices.

National presidents
 1963–1975: Stan Little
 1975–1983: Grace Hartman
 1983–1991: Jeff Rose
 1991–2003: Judy Darcy
 2003–2015: Paul Moist
 2015–present: Mark Hancock

National secretary-treasurers
 1963–1967: Robert P. Rintoul
 1967–1975: Grace Hartman
 1975–1985: Kealey Cummings
 1985–1989: Jean-Claude Laniel
 1989–1991: Judy Darcy
 1991–2001: Geraldine McGuire
 2001–2011: Claude Généreux
 2011–2021: Charles Fleury
 2021–present: Candace Rennick

Archives 
There is a Canadian Union of Public Employees fond at Library and Archives Canada. The archival reference number is R5440, former archival reference number MG28-I234. The fond covers the date range 1919 to 2009. It contains 105.46 meters of textual records, along with a number of other media records.

References

External links

 
Canadian Union of Public Employees – Web Archive created by the University of Toronto Libraries

 
1963 establishments in Ontario
Canadian Labour Congress
International Transport Workers' Federation
Public Services International
Trade unions established in 1963